August Johannes (Hannes) Ryömä (24 April 1878 – 22 May 1939) was a Finnish physician and politician, born in Karkku.

Biography 
He was a member of the Parliament of Finland for the Social Democratic Party of Finland from 1919 to 1939. He served as Minister of Finance from December 1926 to December 1927 and Minister of Transport and Public Works from 1937 to 1938. He died in Helsinki, aged 61.

References

1878 births
1939 deaths
People from Sastamala
People from Turku and Pori Province (Grand Duchy of Finland)
Social Democratic Party of Finland politicians
Ministers of Finance of Finland
Ministers of Transport and Public Works of Finland
Members of the Parliament of Finland (1919–22)
Members of the Parliament of Finland (1922–24)
Members of the Parliament of Finland (1924–27)
Members of the Parliament of Finland (1927–29)
Members of the Parliament of Finland (1929–30)
Members of the Parliament of Finland (1930–33)
Members of the Parliament of Finland (1933–36)
Members of the Parliament of Finland (1936–39)
20th-century Finnish physicians
University of Helsinki alumni